The 2000 TAC Cup season was the 9th season of the TAC Cup competition. Geelong Falcons have won there 2nd premiership title after defeating Eastern Ranges in the grand final by a 22 points.

Ladder

Grand Final

References 

NAB League
Nab League